Silver Age is the tenth solo album from former Hüsker Dü and Sugar frontman Bob Mould. Mould was joined on bass by Jason Narducy and on drums by Superchunk's Jon Wurster.

For the release of Silver Age, the trio embarked on a series of concerts where, in addition to material from the new album and a few Hüsker Dü songs, they played the entirety of Sugar's Copper Blue in order. Copper Blue was simultaneously released in a 20th anniversary edition.

Track listing 
All tracks written by Bob Mould.

"Star Machine" - 3:25
"Silver Age" - 3:02
"The Descent" - 3:55
"Briefest Moment" - 3:18
"Steam of Hercules" - 4:17
"Fugue State" - 3:33
"Round The City Square" - 4:04
"Angels Rearrange" - 3:16
"Keep Believing" - 4:25
"First Time Joy" - 4:53

Personnel
Bob Mould - guitars, vocals, keyboards, producer
Jason Narducy - bass
Jon Wurster - drums
Beau Sorenson - engineer
Nathan Winter - assistant engineer
Jim Wilson - mastering
Nic Pope - assistant mix engineer
Maggie Frost - artwork
Shelly Mosman - portrait
Frank Riley - Booking Agents
Paul Boswell - Booking Agents
Josh Grier - legal
Jaime Herman - legal assistant
Jordan Kurland - management
Justin Little - management
Nasty Little Man - publicity
Steve Martin - publicity

Charts

References

2012 albums
Bob Mould albums
Albums produced by Bob Mould
Merge Records albums